Open Philanthropy is a research and grantmaking foundation that makes grants based on the doctrine of effective altruism. It was founded as a partnership between GiveWell and Good Ventures. Its current co-chief executive officers are Holden Karnofsky and Alexander Berger, and its main funders are Cari Tuna and Dustin Moskovitz. Dustin says that their wealth, worth $11 billion, is "pooled up around us right now, but it belongs to the world. We intend not to have much when we die."

History

Dustin Moskovitz made an $11 billion fortune through co-founding Facebook, and later Asana. He and his wife Cari Tuna were inspired by Peter Singer's The Life You Can Save, and became the youngest couple to sign Bill Gates and Warren Buffett’s Giving Pledge, promising to give away most of their money. Tuna quit her journalist job at The Wall Street Journal to do philanthropy full-time, and the couple started the Good Ventures foundation in 2011. Good Ventures partnered with GiveWell, a charity evaluator founded by Holden Karnofsky and Elie Hassenfeld. The partnership named itself the "Open Philanthropy Project" in 2014, and began operating independently in 2017. Good Ventures holds the funds and distributes them according to recommendations by Open Philanthropy. It is the fifth largest foundation in Silicon Valley.

The organization's guiding philosophy, longtermism, has been associated with eugenics, racism, classism (for its valuation of rich lives over poor lives), and intentional destruction of the natural environment.

Operations
Open Philanthropy's grantmaking is based on the methodology of effective altruism. The organization does not have a mission centered around a cause area. Rather, it does "substantial empirical research" before funding projects that "deliver the greatest social benefits as efficiently as possible". Open Philanthropy has a goal of giving more than $100 million a year. The organization has published a spreadsheet ranking US policy issues by how effectively money might be able to have an impact on their website. They calculate impact using disability-adjusted life years. Moskovitz and Tuna hope that by being open about their work, they can "help others become better philanthropists". They consider their work "high-risk philanthropy", and expect "that most of our work will fail to have an impact". Open Philanthropy can also "fund longer timelines than government or industry". Notable people that Open Philanthropy has consulted with include Avril Haines, the director of national intelligence under US President Joe Biden, and political scientist Steven Teles. Other funders who have contributed to Open Philanthropy include Instagram co-founder Mike Krieger, who pledged $750,000.

Focus areas 

Open Philanthropy has four categories of focus areas: global health and development, US policy, global catastrophic risks, and science. The organization also invests in animal welfare.

Global health and development

Open Philanthropy's investments in global health and development include efforts to cure iodine deficiencies, repair the environment, and prevent malaria. Of their global health and development giving, Tuna said, “I am still optimistic that we can do better than just giving money to poor people, but in the meantime, we’re doing a lot of just giving money to poor people.” In 2021, GiveWell decided to defer $110 million out of its $300 million annual grant from Open Philanthropy, including money allocated to GiveDirectly, which gives money to poor people, to be spent in future years. This was done because GiveWell expects that "they'll be able to spend all of the money in a way that's at least five times as effective as giving money directly to the world's poorest people".

Grants include:

 $17.5 million to Target Malaria, for gene-drive technology to control malaria-carrying mosquitoes
 Over $47 million to GiveDirectly, partially for research to compare the effectiveness of giving money with more traditional developmental aid, and including at least $16 million to be given directly to extremely poor people in Kenya and Uganda
 $1 million to Population Services International for work on drug resistance to antimalarial medication
 Nearly $30 million to the Against Malaria Foundation

US policy

Open Philanthropy ranks US policy issues based on how effectively they predict their funding might be able to move the issue forward. The top two issues are criminal justice reform and macroeconomic stabilization policy. For criminal justice reform, the organization calculates that "a year in prison is half as good as one on the outside" and notes that "the United States incarcerates a larger percentage than almost any other country in the world at great fiscal cost and it has highest rate of criminal homicides in the developed world". For macroeconomic stabilization policy, the organization expects that the value of preventing recessions will be so many times higher than the cost of effective advocacy work that it is willing to invest in it despite success being "highly uncertain". Open Philanthropy has also made grants to help advance marriage equality.

Grants include:

 $335,000 to the Full Employment Project at the Center for Budget and Policy Priorities
 $100,000 to the Center for Popular Democracy’s Fed Up campaign
 $6.3 million to the Accountable Justice Action Fund
 $50 million to Just Impact Advisors, to advise philanthropists and make grants related to criminal justice
 $3 million to the Pew Charitable Trusts' Public Safety Performance Project, to “reduce incarceration and correctional spending while maintaining or improving public safety and concentrating prison beds on high level offenders" at the state level
 $500,000 to California YIMBY. Open Philanthropy was the first institutional funder of the YIMBY movement; however, the movement has garnered individual financial support from many tech executives.
 $2.4 million to the Center for Election Science

Moskovitz and Tuna have also given tens of millions of dollars to political campaigns and parties as individuals. Of this giving, Dustin states, "This decision was not easy, particularly because we have reservations about anyone using large amounts of money to influence elections. That said, we believe in trying to do as much good as we can, which in this case means using the tools available to us (as they are also available to the opposition)."

Global catastrophic risks
Under their longtermism portfolio, Open Philanthropy supports organizations aimed at tackling global catastrophic risks. This category includes nearly $40 million given for biosecurity and pandemic preparedness, and over $100 million for potential risks from advanced artificial intelligence. Open Philanthropy has also invested in mitigating asteroid collision risk. The organization has been criticized for its narrow focus on risks that might "kill enough people to threaten civilization as we know it". By "flooding" money into biosecurity, Open Philanthropy is "absorbing much of the field’s experienced research capacity, focusing the attention of experts on this narrow, extremely unlikely, aspect of biosecurity risk".

Grants include:

 $17.5 million to Sherlock Biosciences, for viral diagnostic tools.
 About $38 million to the Johns Hopkins Center for Health Security
 $11.3 million to the University of Washington’s Institute for Protein Design to develop a universal flu vaccine

Science
Open Philanthropy named eleven areas in science "that it considers neglected by other funders", "including tuberculosis, chronic pain and obesity". Grants within the science bucket include the areas of human health and wellbeing, scientific innovation, science supporting biosecurity and pandemic preparedness, transformative basic science, and other scientific research areas. Funding for science was $40 million in 2017, with the intention of increasing "several times over the coming years". The money was given to four teams of scientists whose proposals had been rejected by the National Institutes of Health. Grants include $6.4 million to Stephen Johnston and his team at Arizona State University to test a cancer vaccine for middle-aged pet dogs.

Animal welfare
Holden Karnofsky claims that Open Philanthropy "is the largest funder in the world of farm animal welfare", including investing in alternative proteins and animal welfare advocacy. Open Philanthropy made an investment in Impossible Foods in 2016, to support the growth of non-animal meats. It is also a patron of The Good Food Institute. Research done by Open Philanthropy includes an investigation on the pros and cons of industrializing insect meat production as well as an investigation of the economic viability of cultivated meat.

References

External links
 

Non-profit organizations based in San Francisco
Organizations established in 2017
Philanthropic organizations based in the United States
Organizations associated with effective altruism
2017 establishments in California
Research organizations in the United States